The IWA Mid-South Hardcore Championship was a short-lived title in the IWA Mid-South promotion based in Louisville, Kentucky. The title first appeared in 1999, when Mad Man Pondo defeated "The Human Wrecking Ball" Pete Madden (who brought the title with him to the IWA (any lineage and history of the title before this date is unknown).  The title was in use until March 4, 2000 when the IWA Mid-South Heavyweight Champion 2 Tuff Tony defeated both Mad Man Pondo and the Hardcore Champion Delilah Starr in a three-way title unification Fans Bring the Weapons match.

Title history

See also 
 Independent Wrestling Association Mid-South

Notes

External links
IWA Mid-South Hardcore Title History
IWA Mid-South Title Histories

IWA Mid-South championships
Hardcore wrestling championships